Duncanville is an unincorporated community in Tuscaloosa County, Alabama, United States. Duncanville has a post office with ZIP code 35456, which opened on August 22, 1898. Duncanville was named in honor of either William M. Duncan, a local property owner, or W. Butler Duncan, an official with the Gulf, Mobile, and Northern Railroad.

References

Unincorporated communities in Tuscaloosa County, Alabama
Unincorporated communities in Alabama